Septemvriytsi may refer to:

 In Bulgaria (written in Cyrillic as Септемврийци):
 Septemvriytsi, Dobrich Province - a village in the Kavarna municipality, Dobrich Province
 Septemvriytsi, Montana Province - a village in the Valchedram municipality, Montana Province
 Septemvriytsi, Vidin Province - a village in the Dimovo Municipality, Vidin Province